The politics of Palau take place in a presidential representative democratic republic, whereby the President of Palau is both head of state and head of government. Palau currently has no political parties and is a de facto non-partisan democracy although there is no law preventing the formation of political parties.

Executive power is exercised by the government. Legislative power is vested in both the government and the Palau National Congress. The judiciary of Palau is independent of the executive and the legislature.

History 
Palau adopted a constitution on January 1, 1981.

While calm in recent years, Palau witnessed several instances of political violence in the 1980s. The republic's first president, Haruo I. Remeliik, was assassinated in 1985; the Minister of State was found to be complicit in the crime. Palau's third president, Lazarus Salii, committed suicide in August 1988 amid bribery allegations. Salii's personal assistant had been imprisoned several months earlier after being convicted of firing shots into the home of the Speaker of the House of Delegates.

Palau gained independence from the United Nations trusteeship administered by the United States on 1 October 1994 and entered a Compact of Free Association with the United States.

The Senate passed legislation making Palau an "offshore" financial center in 1998. Opponents to the legislation voiced fears that the country would become a haven for money launderers and other sorts of criminal activity. In December 1999, a group of major international banks banned U.S. dollar-denominated transactions involving Palau and the other Pacific island states of Vanuatu and Nauru.

Executive branch
Presidential elections take place every four years, when the president and vice president run on separate tickets. The president, who is the head of state and head of government, is currently Surangel Whipps Jr.

Cabinet 
The President is advised and assisted in governing by his/her Cabinet, composed of the Vice President and ministers responsible for the eight government ministries.

Legislature 

The Palau National Congress (Olbiil era Kelulau) is a bicameral legislature consisting of the House of Delegates and the Senate of Palau, which both sit at the Capitol Complex in Ngerulmud, Melekeok State.

 The House of Delegates has 16 members, each serving four-year terms from single-seat constituencies.
 The Senate has 13 members, also serving four-year terms in multi-seat constituencies.

In the last elections, held on 1 November 2016, only non-partisans were elected; no political parties exist.

Elections

Judiciary 

The judiciary of Palau interprets and applies the laws of Palau, as modified by custom and tradition, to ensure equal justice under law, and to provide a mechanism for dispute resolution. The judiciary comprises a four-member Supreme Court, a Court of Common Pleas, and a Land Court. The Supreme Court has a trial division and an appellate division and is presided over by the Chief Justice, assisted by three Associate Justices and a number of ad hoc part-time Associate Justices.

Council of Chiefs 
The Council of Chiefs consists of one traditional leader from each of the sixteen States of Palau. It exists to ensure that traditional ways of life are preserved in Palau. The Council has an official advisory role to the President, specifically on issues relating to the tradition laws and customs and how they relate to Palau's Constitution and laws. The sixteen members each have a unique title.

The current Chairman of the Council was Yutaka Gibbons of Koror.

Agencies 
The executive branch also has some independent agencies, including the Environmental Quality Protection Board, created in 1981 and tasked with protecting the "unique and aesthetically beautiful environment while promoting sustainable economic and social development".

COFA Trust Fund Board 
To manage the funds appropriate to Palau from the United States through the Compact of Free Association (COFA), the COFA Trust Fund Board was reestablished in 2014. The Board meets monthly to review the trust fund's performance and meets annually with the investment advisor (currently Raymond James & Associates' Asia-Pacific Group, based in Guam).

References